Tucutí is a corregimiento in Chepigana District, Darién Province, Panama with a population of 1,200 as of 2010. Its population as of 1990 was 1,455; its population as of 2000 was 1,263.

References

Corregimientos of Darién Province
Road-inaccessible communities of Panama